Taranaki Rugby, previously the Taranaki Rugby Football Union, is the governing body for rugby union in Taranaki, New Zealand; Taranaki is a region of New Zealand that covers areas in the districts of New Plymouth and South Taranaki. Established in 1889, they represent the Mitre 10 Cup side, Taranaki Bulls, and Farah Palmer Cup side, Taranaki Whio. It is also affiliated with the Chiefs Super Rugby franchise. Their home playing colours are amber and black and they play their home games at TET Stadium & Events Centre in Inglewood.

History

Early years 
Taranaki was officially established in 1889 after a team chosen from the surrounding clubs in existence played as Egmont in 1885. They began with a brown coloured jersey before adopting the amber and black hoops in 1892. During the amateur period, the team won the Ranfurly Shield on four occasions. It had also won seven-second division titles in the National Provincial Championship, more than any other team. Further notable moments were in 1959, when a record 35,000 spectators attended Rugby Park in New Plymouth to see the province play the British Lions. Two years later 36,000 people were on hand to watch France defeat the side 11-9.

Their first Ranfurly Shield victory came in 1913 when Auckland was defeated 14-11. Six successful defences followed before a 12-6 loss to Wellington in September 1914. In 1957 shield holders Wellington was defeated in a friendly match early in the year and a rematch was scheduled for later in the season. Otago defeated Wellington, and Otago accepted a special challenge by Taranaki. The match was played on 28 September 1957, the last Saturday of the season, after King Country gave up its scheduled fixture with Taranaki. Taranaki won against Otago for them to, later on, go a 13-match tenure.

In 1963 Taranaki regained the Ranfurly Shield once again off Wellington with a win at Athletic Park. Their third tenure would be its most successful one. The first challenge came from Wanganui who were making their second challenge of the season, having lost earlier to Auckland. Wanganui later would suffer a further defeat in 1964. Taranaki lost to Auckland in their last defence in 1965 and would not reclaim the shield again until 1996 when they edged Auckland 42-39. North Harbour lost narrowly in a tight contest before Taranaki was beaten by 20 points against Waikato.

Professional era 
In August 2011 Taranaki defeated Southland 15-12 in Invercargill to begin a fifth tenure of the shield. This ended in October 2012 when Waikato won the last challenge of the season. In 2013 Taranaki RFU assembled a women's professional team although it was later disbanded the following year. They claimed the national title for the first time in their history with a win over Tasman in the 2014 ITM Cup.

Referees 
Taranaki has a proud history of producing top level referees. Brian Duffy was the region's first test match referee and controlled six internationals, including one test between the British and Irish Lions and All Blacks in 1977. Paul Williams followed with his test debut coming in 2017. 

Cam Stone and Will Johnston are in the National Panel and take charge of domestic competition matches. Richard Kelly featured in the panel for 12 years, including a successful sevens career, where he was the world's most capped sevens referee when he retired in March 2021. He controlled 280 matches over 52 tournaments, including the Gold Coast Commonwealth Games in 2018, 2018 World Rugby 7s World Cup and 2016 Rio Olympics, in which he refereed one semi-final. 

Other Taranaki referees have been involved in the national scene in the past, these are; Dee Luckin, Darryl Heibner, Chris Pollock, Brian MacDonald, Paul Macfie, Stuart Beissell, Ross Whitmore, Paul Honiss, Russell Hodge and Murray Dombroski.

Affiliated clubs 
There are 29 registered clubs incorporated and secondary schools affiliated with the Taranaki RFU, most of which have teams at both senior and junior levels. The Taranaki Rugby Referees' Association is also an affiliated member of the Taranaki RFU. The organisation provides match officials for senior club rugby down to junior grades. They also provide sideline support personnel to home National Provincial Championship, Super Rugby and test matches. 

Bell Block Rugby Sports & Community Club
Central Rugby and Sports Club
Clifton Rugby and Sports Club
Coastal Rugby Football Club
Eltham Rugby Football Club
Francis Douglas Memorial College
Hawera High School
Inglewood High School
Inglewood United Rugby Football Club
Kaitake Rugby Football Club
Kaponga Rugby Football Club
New Plymouth Boys' High School
New Plymouth Girls' High School
New Plymouth High School Old Boys' Rugby Football and Sports Club
Okaiawa Rugby Football Club
Okato Rugby Football Club
Opunake High School
Patea Rugby & Sports Club
Rahotu Community And Sports Club
Sacred Heart Girls' College
Southern Rugby Football Club
Spotswood College
Spotswood United Rugby Football & Sports Club
Stratford Eltham Rugby & Sports Club
Stratford High School
Taranaki Diocesan School for Girls
Toko Rugby Football Club
Tukapa Rugby and Sports Club
Waitara High School

Players

Taranaki Bulls 

Taranaki RFU has several teams under its control, one of note is the Taranaki Bulls who compete in New Zealand's national rugby union competition the Mitre 10 Cup. Their top professional team, the Bulls is coached by Willie Rickards and co-captained by lock Mitchell Brown and midfielder Teihorangi Walden. Their traditional colors are amber and black hoops with white shorts, with Canterbury of New Zealand being the main manufacturer. They are also sponsored by proud Taranaki firm Yarrows the Bakers.

Taranaki Whio 
Taranaki Whio is the women's representative side that was reintroduced in 2018 to compete in the Farah Palmer Cup. The 2020 squad for the Farah Palmer Cup is coached by former Taranaki men's representative Brendan Haami. The squad consists of 29 players, they are; Leah Barnard, Gayle Broughton, Sharee Brown, Tiana Davison, Freedom Edmonds, Chelsea Fowler, Tachelle Gardiner, Natale Haupapa, Iritana Hohaia, Kaya-Rose Kahui, Donia King, Alicia Manuirirangi, Kelsyn McCook, Victoria McCullough, Hannah McLean, Danielle Muggeridge, Paige Neilson, Jaymi Ngaia, Kate Parkinson, Chloe Sampson, Brooke Sim, Lyn Smith, Jalana Smith, Kate Thomson, Catriona Tulloch, Aliene Wallis, Sharniqua Weston-Jacobson, Nicole Whittle, Sarah Winter.

Notable players 
Taranaki has produced 83 men's New Zealand internationals to date. Below is a list of New Zealand national rugby union players along with their number and year of debut in brackets.

Alfred Bayly (35 - 1893)
Alan Good (42 - 1893)
James Lambie (27 - 1893)
Walter Bayly (48 - 1894)
Hugh Good (50 - 1894)
Daniel Hughes (51 - 1894)
Lewis Allen (56 - 1896)
Donald Watson (65 - 1896)
Arthur Humphries (73 - 1897)
Bill Wells (75 - 1897)
Hugh Mills (80 - 1897)
Bernard O'Dowda (88 - 1901)
Billy Glenn (111 - 1904)
Frank Glasgow (117 - 1905)
Jimmy Hunter (118 - 1905)
Simon Mynott (120 - 1905)
Jimmie O'Sullivan (122 - 1905)
Harold Abbott (130 - 1905)
Jack Colman (142 - 1907)
Donald Cameron (150 - 1908)
Jack Stohr (165 - 1910)
Henry Dewar (175 - 1913)
Mick Cain (187 - 1913)
Charles Brown (192 - 1913)
Reginald Taylor (202 - 1913)
George Loveridge (206 - 1913)
Edward Roberts (207 - 1913)
Alfred West (225 - 1920)
Richard Fogarty (230 - 1921)
Charles Kingstone (231 - 1921)
Harold Masters (254 - 1922)
Percy Hickey (264 - 1922)
Handley Brown (290 - 1924)
Gus Hart (293 - 1924)
Davy Johnston (318 - 1925)
Jack Walter (312 - 1925)
Edward Ward (335 - 1928)
Alfred Kivell (375 - 1929)
Ray Clarke (390 - 1932)
Arthur Collins (391 - 1932)
Jack Sullivan (428 - 1936)
Roy Roper (515 - 1949)
George Beatty (517 - 1950)
Maurice Cockerill (522 - 1951)
Peter Burke (534 - 1951)
Noel Bowden (544 - 1952)
Ross Brown (572 - 1955)
Roger Urbahn (598 - 1959)
Kevin Briscoe (599 - 1959)
John McCullough (603 - 1959)
Terry O'Sullivan (612 - 1960)
Roger Boon (616 - 1960)
Neil Wolfe (620 - 1961)
John Major (643 - 1963)
Brian Muller (656 - 1967)
Murray Wills (661 - 1967)
Alan Smith (667 - 1967)
Bill Currey (671 - 1968)
Ian Eliason (706 - 1972)
Alistair Scown (710 - 1972)
Ash Gardiner (728 - 1974)
Graham Mourie (757 - 1976)
John McEldowney (768 - 1976)
Dave Loveridge (791 - 1978)
Murray Watts (793 - 1979)
Kieran Crowley (848 - 1983)
Bryce Robins (863 - 1985)
Bull Allen (933 - 1993)
Gordon Slater (968 - 1997)
Andrew Hore (1019 - 2002)
Chris Masoe (1059 - 2005)
Jason Eaton (1063 - 2005)
Scott Waldrom (1085 - 2008)
Jarrad Hoeata (1109 - 2011)
Beauden Barrett (1115 - 2012)
Charlie Ngatai (1141 - 2015)
Waisake Naholo (1142 - 2015)
James Broadhurst (1144 - 2015)
Seta Tamanivalu (1148 - 2016)
Scott Barrett (1155 - 2016)
Jordie Barrett (1159 - 2017)
Te Toiroa Tahuriorangi (1174 - 2018)
Angus Ta'avao (1175 - 2018)
Tupou Vaa'i (1188 - 2020)
Pita Gus Sowakula (1201 - 2022)

Personnel and statistics

Seasonal record

List of centurions

List of top try-scorers

List of top point-scorers

References

External links
 Official Site
 Taranaki Referee Associations website
Taranaki rugby (NZHistory.net.nz)

New Zealand rugby union teams